"Knuck If You Buck" is a song by American Southern hip hop group Crime Mob. It was recorded at PatchWerk Recording Studios in Atlanta and released on June 29, 2004 via Reprise Records as the first single from their eponymous debut studio album Crime Mob (2004). Written by members Jarques "M.I.G." Usher, Chris "Killa C" Henderson, Jonathan "Lil' Jay" Lewis, Venetia "Princess" Lewis and Brittany "Diamond" Carpentero, it was produced by Lil' Jay, and features fellow rapper Lil Scrappy. Crime Mob was discovered by Grand Master Tommy Phillips IV of Crunk Incorporated known as #LiTgod Serious Lord.

The single peaked at number 76 on the US Billboard Hot 100 and was certified Platinum by the Recording Industry Association of America.

Lyrics and composition
The song's lyrics have been described as a "celebration of elbow-throwing and fist-fighting". With the group given a $1,000 advance, an unmixed version of the song became a local hit in Atlanta.

Music video
Directed by Bernard Gourley, the music video was released in August 2004.

Critical reception
Mosi Reeves of Creative Loafing Atlanta described the song as "a raucous fire-starter" and "one of the hardest songs of the era". David Jeffries of AllMusic labeled it a "pumping party jam" and among the best tracks on the Crime Mob album.

Impact
"Knuck If You Buck" has remained a nightclub staple. The song has also been known to cause altercations at parties. In 2006, during a late-night party at a Howard Johnson hotel ballroom near Fredericksburg, Virginia, a fight on the dance floor began after the DJ played the song, during which 16-year-old Baron "Deuce" Braswell II, who played on the football team at Courtland High School in nearby Spotsylvania, was stabbed to death. The suspect in the stabbing was convicted of second-degree murder and was sentenced to 30 years in prison in January 2007. In 2007, a fight broke out at an after-party hosted by the Harvard Society of Black Scientists and Engineers. Police arrested two people who were not affiliated with Harvard for disorderly conduct.

In 2009, Pitchfork Media named "Knuck If You Buck" at no. 381 in its list of best songs of the 2000s. Complex ranked "Knuck If You Buck" no. 16 in its 50-deep list "The Best Atlanta Rap Songs" in 2015. Two years earlier, Complex ranked the song no. 7 in its list "25 Rap Songs That Make Us Want To Punch Someone In the Face".

In The Rap Year Book, Meaghan Garvey considered "Knuck If You Buck" to be the most important song of 2004: "...its super-essentialized beat and evergreen 'I wish a bitch would' threats never go out of season".

Remixes, samples, and other uses
The official remix was released on Lil Scrappy's G's Up mixtape. It features verses by Daz Dillinger and Lil Scrappy and new verses by the group.

In 2015, the beat of this song was used for DLow's "Bet You Can't Do It Like Me" which reached No. 45 on the Billboard Hot 100.

The song received renewed attention throughout 2016. Before a rally for the Donald Trump presidential campaign at the University of Illinois at Chicago that eventually was cancelled on March 11, 2016, protesters were heard chanting "Fuck Donald Trump!" to the tune of the "Knuck If You Buck" chorus. "The Club", a first-season episode of the new TV series Atlanta, used the song as background music during a scene at a nightclub. The Wrap reported that viewers criticized the subdued nature of clubgoers depicted when the song played. "Juju on that Beat (TZ Anthem)", a single by Zay Hilfigerrr & Zayion McCall that peaked at No. 5 on the Billboard Hot 100, sampled the beat of "Knuck If You Buck".

Charts

Weekly charts

Year-end charts

Certifications

Release history

References

External links

2004 debut singles
2004 songs
Crime Mob songs
Lil Scrappy songs
Reprise Records singles